The minister of state for immigration is a senior minister of state in the Home Office of the Government of the United Kingdom.

From June 2017 to July 2019 and since October 2022, the minister has attended cabinet meetings. 

The role was known as Parliamentary Under-Secretary of State for Future Borders and Immigration from 2020 to 2021 and Parliamentary Under-Secretary of State for Safe and Legal Migration from 2021 to 2022.

Responsibilities
As of 2022 the minister has responsibility for legal migration, illegal migration and asylum, including:

UK points-based system
Simplifying the immigration system and immigration rules
Current and future visa system
Asylum
Net migration
EU Settlement Scheme
Nationality
Windrush
Modern slavery

List of Ministers for Immigration

 Brynmor John (Labour) (1976–1979)

References

Home Office (United Kingdom)
Immigration to the United Kingdom
1979 establishments in the United Kingdom
Ministerial offices in the United Kingdom